Swaledale is a city in Cerro Gordo County, Iowa, United States. The population was 144 at the time of the 2020 census. It is part of the Mason City Micropolitan Statistical Area.

Geography
Swaledale is located at  (42.977956, -93.315537).

Demographics

2010 census
As of the census of 2010, there were 165 people, 77 households, and 46 families living in the city. The racial makeup of the city was 97.6% White and 2.4% from other races. Hispanic or Latino of any race were 3.0% of the population.

There were 77 households, of which 22.1% had children under the age of 18 living with them, 50.6% were married couples living together, 6.5% had a female householder with no husband present, 2.6% had a male householder with no wife present, and 40.3% were non-families. 32.5% of all households were made up of individuals, and 15.6% had someone living alone who was 65 years of age or older. The average household size was 2.14 and the average family size was 2.76.

The median age in the city was 48.4 years. 20% of residents were under the age of 18; 3.6% were between the ages of 18 and 24; 22.5% were from 25 to 44; 29.7% were from 45 to 64; and 24.2% were 65 years of age or older. The gender makeup of the city was 49.7% male and 50.3% female.

2000 census
As of the census of 2000, there were 174 people, 75 households, and 48 families living in the city. The racial makeup of the city was 100.00% White.

There were 75 households, out of which 29.3% had children under the age of 18 living with them, 57.3% were married couples living together, 4.0% had a female householder with no husband present, and 36.0% were non-families. 30.7% of all households were made up of individuals, and 17.3% had someone living alone who was 65 years of age or older. The average household size was 2.32 and the average family size was 2.96.

In the city, the population was spread out, with 24.7% under the age of 18, 10.9% from 18 to 24, 23.6% from 25 to 44, 20.7% from 45 to 64, and 20.1% who were 65 years of age or older. The median age was 38 years. For every 100 females, there were 95.5 males. For every 100 females age 18 and over, there were 104.7 males.

The median income for a household in the city was $28,906, and the median income for a family was $34,167. Males had a median income of $25,000 versus $17,917 for females. The per capita income for the city was $11,710. About 4.2% of families and 5.2% of the population were below the poverty line, including 9.4% of those under the age of eighteen and none of those 65 or over.

Education
Swaledale is part of the West Fork Community School District, formed in 2011 by the merger of the Rockwell–Swaledale Community School District and the SCMT (Sheffield–Chapin–Meservey–Thornton) Community School District. The Rockwell–Swaledale district was formed in 1960 by the merger of the Rockwell Community School District and the Swaledale Community School District.

Notable resident
Don Eddy, Major League Baseball pitcher for the Chicago White Sox from 1970 to 1971

References

External links

Cities in Cerro Gordo County, Iowa
Cities in Iowa
Mason City, Iowa micropolitan area